The Tabernacle of the Linaioli (Italian: Tabernacolo dei Linaioli, literally "Tabernacle of the Linen manufacturers") is a marble aedicula designed by Lorenzo Ghiberti, with paintings by Fra Angelico, dating to 1432–1433. It is housed in the National Museum of San Marco, Florence, central Italy.

History
The tabernacle was commissioned for the exterior of the seat of the Linaioli (the guild of linen workers in Florence), in the former Old Market, in the October 1432. The marble parts were executed by Simone di Nanni da Fiesole, under design by Lorenzo Ghiberti. The contract for the internal paintings was signed by Angelico on 2 July 1433, for a total of 190 golden florins. The predella is generally dated to 1433–1435.

The work was a large one, comparable only to Cimabue's Santa Trinita Maestà or Duccio di Buoninsegna's Rucellai Madonna. It has been speculated that the marble frame was sized according to a pre-existing painting, which was later replaced by Fra Angelico's, or that the size was inspired by that of the statues in Orsanmichele niches.

Work had been  moved to the Palazzo della Borsa as early as 1777, together with other works commissioned by the city's guilds. In that year it was transferred to the Uffizi, whence it was transferred to the current location in 1924.

The tabernacle was restored in 2010.

Description
The tabernacle is composed of a rectangular marble frame, with a triangular top with a sculpted almond depicting the "Blessing Christ and Cherubims". In the center, within an arched opening, are Fra Angelico's panel of the Maestà with twelve musician angels. 

At the front are two shutter panels with further paintings of saints. These are, internally, John the Baptist (left) and John the Evangelist (right); and externally Mark the Evangelist (left) and Saint Peter (right). The panels are completed by a  predella, placed below, with three scenes of St. Peter Dictating the Gospel to St. Mark, Adoration of the Magi and Martyrdom of St. Mark. The figure of Mark is recurrent due to his status as the patron of the corporation which commissioned the work.

The central panel, although damaged, has a style similar to Angelico's early works, with a marble step over which is the throne. Behind two draperies (perhaps a hint to the guild's textile activities) is a ceiling painted in blue with stars and the Holy Spirit dove, which is similar to Masolino's Annunciation in Washington, DC.

References

Sources

External links
Page at Florence museums website

1433 sculptures
1430s paintings
Paintings by Fra Angelico
Paintings of the Madonna and Child
Paintings in the collection of the Museo Nazionale di San Marco
Paintings depicting John the Baptist
Paintings depicting John the Apostle
Musical instruments in art
Paintings depicting Saint Peter
Paintings depicting Mark the Evangelist